Browns Glacier is a small glacier  north of Chaos Glacier, flowing westward into the northern extremity of Ranvik Bay. The glacier was charted by Norwegian cartographers from air photographs taken by the Lars Christensen Expedition (1936–37), and was further identified in John H. Roscoe's 1952 study of this area from U.S. Navy Operation Highjump (1946–47) photography. It was named by Roscoe for Lieutenant (j.g.) Eduardo P. Brown, U.S. Navy, photographic officer with the western task group of Operation Highjump.

See also
 List of glaciers in the Antarctic
 Glaciology

References 

Glaciers of Ingrid Christensen Coast